In enzymology, a 3-methyl-2-oxobutanoate dehydrogenase is an enzyme that catalyzes the chemical reaction

3-methyl-2-oxobutanoate + [dihydrolipoyllysine-residue (2-methylpropanoyl)transferase] lipoyllysine  [dihydrolipoyllysine-residue (2-methylpropanoyl)transferase] S-(2-methylpropanoyl)dihydrolipoyllysine + CO2

The 3 substrates of this enzyme are 3-methyl-2-oxobutanoate, dihydrolipoyllysine-residue (2-methylpropanoyl)transferase, and lipoyllysine, whereas its 3 products are dihydrolipoyllysine-residue (2-methylpropanoyl)transferase, S-(2-methylpropanoyl)dihydrolipoyllysine, and CO2.

This enzyme belongs to the family of oxidoreductases, specifically those acting on the aldehyde or oxo group of donor with a disulfide as acceptor.

This enzyme participates in valine, leucine and isoleucine degradation.  It employs one cofactor, thiamin diphosphate. It is the E1 subunit of a catalytic complex.

Structural studies

References

 
 
 
 
 

EC 1.2.4
Thiamine enzymes
Enzymes of known structure